The Barela–Bledsoe House is a historic house in the North Valley of Albuquerque, New Mexico. It was built around 1870 by Juan Estevan Barela (1842–1886), a prosperous farmer and merchant. The house was inherited by his widow Abundia García de Barela (c. 1849–1943), who owned the property until her death. In the twentieth century, it was the residence of Robert Dietz III (c. 1915–1991), whose previous home is also a listed historic property. The Barela–Bledsoe House was listed on the New Mexico State Register of Cultural Properties in 1976 and the National Register of Historic Places in 1979.

The house is a one-story, L-shaped building wrapping around the north and east sides of a placita or courtyard; a former wing enclosing the west side of the courtyard is no longer extant. The two remaining wings are joined by a zaguan, a covered passageway opening onto the placita. A portal or portico is attached to the east side of the house. The house has Territorial-style details including wooden door and window trim with pedimented, dentil-patterned lintels. The east wing contains seven rooms with  ceilings supported by milled beams, an adaptation of the traditional viga and latilla roof using more modern construction methods. A second zaguan through the center of the east wing has been closed off to form a hallway. The north wing houses a separate apartment and a garage.

References

Houses on the National Register of Historic Places in New Mexico
National Register of Historic Places in Albuquerque, New Mexico
Houses in Albuquerque, New Mexico
New Mexico State Register of Cultural Properties